1988
Soviet
Films